During the 1924–25 English football season, Brentford competed in the Football League Third Division South. After finishing in 21st place, the club successfully applied for re-election. The 41 goals scored during the season is the fewest in club history.

Season summary

Brentford manager Archie Mitchell conducted an overhaul of his half back and forward lines during the 1924 off-season, releasing James Kerr, Freddy Capper, Bobby Hughes, Sidney Mulford and Henry Parkinson and signing 12 new players, which included new forward Jack Allen to partner Reginald Parker in attack. Aside from a three-match winning streak in September, which lifted the club as high as 9th, 10 defeats in the following 12 games saw Mitchell step down as manager after a 5–3 defeat to Isthmian League club St Albans City in the FA Cup fifth qualifying round on 29 November 1924. He was replaced by Fred Halliday, who stepped up from an administrative role to take over as Brentford manager for the third time.

At the time of Halliday's first match in charge, Brentford had been rooted to the bottom of the Third Division South for nearly a month. Halliday fared little better than his predecessor, despite a 10-match spell from mid-December to early February which saw the Bees lose just three times. Mid-season signings Jimmy McCree, Bert Young and new captain Alex Graham failed to strengthen the team, though four goals in 9 late-season appearances from new acquisition Jack Lane at least inspired the team to score 12 goals in the matches in which he played.

Brentford finished the 1924–25 season in 21st place and successfully applied for re-election to the Football League. Though statistically it was not Brentford's worst season, many Football League club records were set or equalled during the campaign, including fewest away victories (1), fewest victories (9), fewest draws (0), consecutive home draws (4), most away defeats (20), most defeats (26), fewest away goals scored (10), fewest goals scored (38) and most away goals conceded (65). A 7–0 defeat to Swansea Town on 8 November 1924 is Brentford's joint-worst league defeat and together with a 7–1 defeat to Plymouth Argyle on 6 September 1924, is a joint-club record for most goals conceded in an away league loss.

League table

Results
Brentford's goal tally listed first.

Legend

Football League Third Division South

FA Cup

 Sources: Statto, 100 Years of Brentford, The Complete History

Playing squad 
Players' ages are as of the opening day of the 1924–25 season.

 Sources: 100 Years of Brentford, Timeless Bees, Football League Players' Records 1888 to 1939

Coaching staff

Archie Mitchell (30 August–2 December 1924)

Fred Halliday (3 December 1924 – 2 May 1925)

Statistics

Appearances and goals

Source: 100 Years of Brentford

Goalscorers 

Source: 100 Years of Brentford

Management

Summary

Transfers & loans 
Cricketers are not included in this list.

References 

Brentford F.C. seasons
Brentford